The Sarakatsani Folklore Museum is a museum dedicated to the history and traditions of the Sarakatsani group native to northern Greek Macedonia. The museum was established in Serres, Central Macedonia, Greece in 1979. The present structure dates to 1997 and was purpose-built to house it. 

On the ground floor are reconstructions of the tsiatoura, the temporary shelter the Sarakatsani use when they are on the move, and the woven huts in which they live, make cheese, and teach their children. All the huts relate to the final phase of the Sarakatsanis nomadic life, during the interwar period.

On the first floor are tools and weaving equipment for the entire process from spinning the thread to the final products, which include bedspreads, flokati rugs, and other textiles. There are also showcases displaying the varieties of Sarakatsani costume for both women and men. 

Since 1998, the museum has been running a two-hour educational program for children of primary school age. Specialists introduce the children to the Sarakatsan way of life, teaching them how to weave, how to spin, and how to live in a Sarakatsan hut. The museum also has a collection of old photographs from all over Greece covering the period 1906–50, a collection of traditional songs, recorded and archived in categories, and a room equipped with audio-visual systems.

Gallery

References

External links
 Official Website

Folk museums in Central Macedonia
Museums in Serres
1979 establishments in Greece
Museums established in 1979
Ethnic museums
Sarakatsani